Zhang Luping (1945-1998) was a Chinese martial artist and mathematician born in Jiaxing, Zhejiang province. He was best known in China for his exceptional skill at tai chi's push hands, and for an incident in his hometown in which he accidentally broke a weightlifting champion’s forearm during an arm wrestling match. He was a student of Cai Hong Xiang (蔡鸿祥), Wang Zi-Ping (王子平), and Fu Zhong Wen (傅鍾文) . He was also a descendant of Zhang Jun (traditional Chinese: 張浚; simplified Chinese: 张浚; pinyin: Zhāng Jùn, 1097–1164) and of Zhang Jiugao (simplified Chinese: 張九皋), who was the brother of Zhang Jiuling (simplified Chinese: 张九龄). He was noted for his deep knowledge of the five styles of tai chi, his superb application of the principles, and his highly developed internal power. In an age when many great martial arts teachers remained reluctant to share their highest insights and techniques, Zhang championed in his teaching an attitude of openness and a strong desire to ensure the continuation of Chinese martial traditions.

Martial arts career 
Zhang started learning Shaolin Kung Fu when he was 13 years old from Shaolin and Jin Woo grandmaster Fang Nan Tang (方南堂). Zhang was captain of the Wushu team  at East Normal University in Shanghai, where he studied under three-time Chinese Wushu national champion (1953-1960) and five-time Chinese national martial arts competition gold medalist Cai Hong Xiang. Because of his excellent performance and dedication to learning the arts, Cai Hong Xiang arranged for Zhang to study under the famous grandmaster Wang Zi-Ping. Zhang also had the privilege at that time to study alongside The Magic Fist Dragon, Cai Long Yun.

Eventually, Zhang developed an interest in tai chi. He learned Chen-style taijiquan from many Chen lineage holders, including Dong Xiang Gen (董祥根) and Du Wen Cai (都文才). whom was the last student of Chen Zhao Kui(陈照奎). His form was also corrected by grandmaster Gu Liu Xin (顾留馨) (a former student of Chen Fake, Sun Lutang, and Chen Weiming, who corrected his style with a level of detail that would set him apart from other Chen style practitioners). Zhang also studied Wu style tai chi with master Sun Ren Zhi (孙润志) and Xin Yi, another internal style similar to tai chi, with the well-known Shang Hai-based master, "Little Tiger" Zhang Hai Sheng (小老虎章海深), who was highly respected for his skill in combat.

Scholarship and emigration to the United States 
Zhang earned his masters degree in mathematics at East Normal University in Shang Hai under Prof. Cheng Chang Ping (陈昌平教授), who had done extensive mathematics work with Prof. Wolf Von Wahl at the University of Bayreuth in West Germany. Zhang also studied under professor Wang Guang Yin (王光寅) at the math research department of Chinese Academy of Sciences in Bei Jing. In 1983, Zhang published an article in The Mathematical Journal (数学学报) entitled “Hλ solutions of the 1st class of Fuchs type equations with operator coefficients” (一类具算子系数的Fuchs型方程的Hλ解) with his colleague Wang Ju Yan (王继延).

Zhang Luping was known in the academic community for his ground-breaking work in differential equations. He came to the United States in 1985 for a master's degree in mathematics at Carnegie-Mellon University in Pittsburgh, PA, following which he completed a doctorate degree and a post doctorate degree at the University of Massachusetts, Amherst under Prof. M. S. Berger. In November of 1994, he co-authored with professor Berger a paper published by International Publications for the PanAmerican Mathematical Journal entitled “A New Method for Large Quasiperiodic Nonlinear Oscillations with Fixed Frequencies for the Non-dissipative Second Order Conservative System of the Second Type” about the communication of applied nonlinear analysis. After completing his post-doctorate work, he taught mathematics at the University of California, Irvine and the University of Massachusetts, Amherst.

Legacy 
In 1975, Zhang became the Zhejiang Province chen style tai chi champion. MA. In 1998, Zhang defeated several local martial artists in Pittsburgh, PA and was invited to teach seminars at the Zhang San Feng Festival at the Tai Chi Farm owned by late master Jou Tsung Hwa. He held seminars all across the U.S. and judged many U.S. competitions, including the Houston 1990 United States National Chinese Martial Arts Competition. He was a Special Master for Taste of China and many similar martial arts events. He was twice pictured on the cover of Tai Chi International Magazine, as well as Inside Kung Fu magazine and the Pa Kua Zhang Newsletter. The Australian magazine "Tai Chi Combat and Health" called Master Zhang the "Real Thing" In Tai Chi for Dummies, author Therese Ikoian wrote, "The late tai chi Master Zhang Lu Ping knew the spiraling technique well. Manny Fuentes had the 'privilege of being thrown around by him'. No matter how well Manny thought that he'd prepared a pending movement, he said that he was moved as easily as if he were a leaf, not a 175-pound man! By the time Zhang manifested the spiraling force up into his arms and hands, it contained an irresistible momentum."

Zhang died in 1998 in Amherst, Massachusetts. His son Huan Zhang, a practitioner of tai chi and a scholar like his father, wrote a biographical article for China’s Premier Tai Chi - The spirit of Kung Fu Magazine（太极武魂杂志) in his father's memory.

References 

 Huan Zhang, (June 2018), "In memory of my father, Zhang Lu Ping", Tai Chi - The spirit of Kung Fu Magazine, Beijing Physical Education Press , China

People from Jiaxing
Chinese male martial artists
Mathematicians from Zhejiang
1945 births
1998 deaths
Chinese tai chi practitioners
20th-century Chinese mathematicians